Cape Keeler is an ice-covered cape, which rises gently northwestward to , forming the south side of the entrance to Revelle Inlet and the northeast side of the entrance to Delisle Inlet on the east coast of Palmer Land, Antarctica. It was discovered on December 20, 1928, by Sir Hubert Wilkins, who named it for Fred E. Keeler of the Lockheed Aircraft Company. An advance base and meteorological station was established at Cape Keeler by the Ronne Antarctic Research Expedition under Finn Ronne in 1947–48.

References

Headlands of Palmer Land